Rudolf Eberhard  (November 1, 1914 Nuremberg – December 26, 1998 Munich)  was a German politician, representative of the Christian Social Union of Bavaria. He was a member of the Landtag of Bavaria between 1950 and 1974.

Honours and awards
 Honorary Doctor of Medicine, University of Erlangen-Nuremberg
 Bavarian Order of Merit (1959)
 Grand Decoration of Honour in Silver with Sash for Services to the Republic of Austria (1959)
 Medal for Combating Deadly Seriousness (1960)
 Grand Merit Cross with Star and Sash

References

See also
List of Bavarian Christian Social Union politicians

Christian Social Union in Bavaria politicians
Ministers of the Bavaria State Government
1914 births
1998 deaths
Politicians from Nuremberg
Recipients of the Grand Decoration with Sash for Services to the Republic of Austria
Grand Crosses with Star and Sash of the Order of Merit of the Federal Republic of Germany